Thomas Augustus Pickett (August 14, 1906 – June 7, 1980), was a United States representative representing Texas's 7th congressional district.  Born in Travis, Texas on August 14, 1906, Pickett lived in Iola before moving to Palestine, Texas with his family, attending the public schools of Palestine, Texas. He graduated from high school in 1923, began attendance at Conway's Business College, and worked for his father's law office for a year. Between 1924 and 1928, Pickett attended the University of Texas at Austin.  He studied law and was admitted to the Texas Bar in 1929, commencing the practice of law in Palestine, Texas.

He was elected County Attorney of Anderson County, Texas, 1931–1935, and District Attorney of the Third Judicial District of Texas, 1935–1945. In 1944, he beat the Democratic incumbent Nat Patton in the primary and defeated Republican J. Perrin Willis in the general election.  He was then elected as a Democrat to the Seventy-ninth Congress in 1944, and was reelected unopposed to the three succeeding Congresses, serving from January 3, 1945, until his resignation on June 30, 1952. During his time in Congress, Pickett served on the House Public Works, Veterans Affairs, and Administration committees, with interests in public works projects on the Neches, Angelinas, and Trinity Rivers, and the economic effects of railroad reorganization for the International-Great Northern Railroad Company on Anderson County.

He then became Vice President of the National Coal Association from July 1, 1952, to March 31, 1961, and Vice President of the Association of American Railroads from April 1, 1961, to November 30, 1967.  Once retired, he resided in Leesburg, Florida, until his death there June 7, 1980.  He was cremated and his ashes interred at St. James Episcopal Church.

References

Sources

1906 births
1980 deaths
People from Falls County, Texas
University of Texas at Austin alumni
People from Palestine, Texas
Texas lawyers
People from Leesburg, Florida
Democratic Party members of the United States House of Representatives from Texas
20th-century American politicians
20th-century American lawyers